Moldovan-Slovenian relations are the bilateral relations between the two countries, Moldova and Slovenia. Moldova recognized the Republic of Slovenia under an unknown date. Diplomatic relations were established on October 27, 1993. Both countries are represented in each other through their embassies in Budapest (Hungary).

State visits 
In April 2003, Moldovan President Petru Lucinschi visited Slovenia.

In 2004, Slovene President Janez Drnovšek met Moldovan President Vladimir Voronin and supported Voronin's initiative to sign a stability and security pact for Moldova.

In April 2007, Moldovan Prime minister Vasile Tarlev visited Slovenian Prime Minister Janez Janša. They both called for stronger business ties between the two countries and signed a memorandum of understanding between the two economy ministries. Tarlev's visit was part of the fourth Moldovan-Slovene business forum in Ljubljana.

Co-operation
Slovenia has offered specific assistance to Moldova regarding Moldova's desire to join the European Union. Slovenian Foreign Minister Dimitrij Rupel, met Moldovan President Voronin in Brussels in 2008 and said that Moldova would need to continue its reforms specifically pointed regarding fighting corruption, the importance of implementing the Telecommunications Act in a manner that ensures pluralism in the media and human rights.

See also 
 Foreign relations of Moldova
 Foreign relations of Slovenia
 Moldova–EU relations

References

External links 

 
Slovenia
Bilateral relations of Slovenia